"The Lost Battalion" refers to the 1st Battalion, 141st Infantry (36th Infantry Division, originally Texas National Guard), which was surrounded by German forces in the Vosges Mountains on 24 October 1944.

Battle

Against the advice of his senior officers, Maj. General John E. Dahlquist committed the "Texas Battalion" to an engagement. The battalion was cut off by the Germans, and attempts by the 141st Infantry's other two battalions to extricate it failed. The 405th Fighter Squadron of the 371st Fighter Group airdropped supplies to the 275 trapped soldiers, but conditions on the ground quickly deteriorated as the Germans continued to repel American attempts to reach the trapped unit.

The final rescue attempt was made by the 442nd Regimental Combat Team, a segregated unit composed of Nisei (second-generation Japanese Americans). The 442nd had been given a period of rest after heavy fighting to liberate Bruyères and Biffontaine, but General Dahlquist called them back early to relieve the beleaguered 2nd and 3rd Battalions of the 36th. In five days of battle, from 26 to 30 October 1944, the 442nd broke through German defenses and rescued 211 men. The 442nd suffered over 800 casualties. I Company went in with 185 men; 8 came out unhurt. K Company engaged the enemy with 186 men; 169 were wounded or killed. Additionally, the commander sent a patrol of 50–55 men to find a way to attack a German road block by the rear and try to liberate the remainder of the trapped men. Only five returned to the "Lost Battalion" perimeter; 42 were taken prisoner and were sent to Stalag VII-A in Moosburg, Bavaria, where they remained until the POW camp was liberated on 29 April 1945. 

The 442nd is the most decorated unit in U.S. military history for its size and length of service, with its component 100th Infantry Battalion earning the nickname "The Purple Heart Battalion" due to the number injured in combat.

Legacy

In 1962, Texas Governor John Connally made the veterans of the 442nd "honorary Texans" for their role in the rescue of the Lost Battalion. Due to the discrimination of that era, three members of the 442nd, Barney Hajiro, James Okubo, and George Sakato, were originally awarded lesser military medals for their participation in the rescue, later upgraded to the Medal of Honor  in 2000, Okubo posthumously. A special law was passed in 2010 awarding members of the unit, and those of the Military Intelligence Service, the Congressional Gold Medal, for which a ceremony was held at the Emancipation Hall of the U.S. Capitol in October 2011, followed by local ceremonies in California, Hawaii, and other states from which unit members had been unable to travel to Washington, D.C.

See also
 442nd Infantry Regiment (United States)
 Daniel Inouye

References

Further reading
 Newman, Tamera. Loyal, No Matter What, edited by Jim Tazoi and Kimiko Yagi Tazoi, Logan, UT: Watkins Printing, 2006
 U.S. Samurais in Bruyeres by Pierre Moulin –   Pierre Moulin

External links
 http://www.moosburg.org/info/stalag/indeng.html

Infantry battalions of the United States Army
Military units and formations of the United States Army in World War II
Battalions of the United States Army in World War II